The Führerbau ("the Führer's building") is a historically significant building at Arcisstrasse 12 in Maxvorstadt, Munich. It was built during the Nazi period, between 1933–1937, and used extensively by Adolf Hitler. Unlike many other buildings associated with the Nazis, the building still stands today. It currently houses the University of Music and Performing Arts Munich.

During the Nazi era, the building served as a symbolic building for Adolf Hitler. After the German surrender, the US occupation forces used both buildings as the "Zentrale Sammelstelle" (Central Collecting Point), which managed the looted art stolen by the Nazis all over Europe.

The building is also notable as the site of the signing of the historic 1938 Munich Agreement, in which Germany received the Sudetenland from Czechoslovakia. Hitler himself signed the document in his office in the building. Other signatories included Germany, Italy, France, and the United Kingdom but notably not Czechoslovakia itself. This is today commemorated by the memorial written in German, Czech and Slovak.

Today, the building houses the University of Music and Performing Arts Munich. Its congress hall now serves as a concert venue. From 2005 to 2011, an unknown number of Stolpersteine (between 20 and 25) were installed in the building until city officials removed them for reasons of "fire protection".

Construction and architecture 
Plans for the building were first made in 1931, by architect Paul Ludwig Troost. It was constructed from 1933 to 1937. Since Troost died in 1934, Leonhard Gall continued the process. Architecturally, the Brienner Strasse is a symmetry axis. A building with a similar design is the Administrative Building of the NSDAP at No. 10 Katharina-von-Bora-Strasse.

References

External links
 Website of the Hochschule für Musik und Theater München

Buildings and structures in Munich
Maxvorstadt
Nazi architecture
Buildings and structures completed in 1937
University of Music and Performing Arts Munich